Dublin University Boat Club (DUBC) is the Rowing club of Trinity College Dublin. The club operates from its boat house at the Irish National War Memorial Gardens, Islandbridge, on the South Bank of the River Liffey. The club colours are black and white with a royal blue shield bearing the arms of Trinity College. Isabel Ormiston Doyle is the current Captain of the club, and the first female captain in the club's history.

History
Dublin University Boat Club's beginnings can be found in the formation of the Pembroke Club in 1836. It was formed by University men and was primarily concerned with the rowing of small boats at Ringsend. In 1847, it was decided that the club membership be restricted to those with ties to the college; in doing so they amalgamated with the fledgling University Rowing Club to become the Dublin University Rowing Club. This club was the first Irish club to field a crew at Henley Royal Regatta. For the next 43 years, it was by far the most successful Irish rowing club.

1866 saw a split in the DURC and the formation of the Dublin University Boat Club. The next 32 years saw both win at Henley, and the majority of important Irish rowing trophies being shared between these two clubs. In 1898 old differences were put aside and the two clubs amalgamated under the name of the Boat Club. The familiar black and white hoops of the Trinity zephyr were retained from the boat club and adopted as the colours for the new club.

Since 1975, women's rowing at Trinity has been facilitated by DUBC's sister club, Dublin University Ladies Boat Club.

Achievements

Since 1881, DUBC has won several titles, including seven Henley wins, three Visitors Challenge Cups, the Ladies' Challenge Plate twice, the Wyfold Challenge Cup and the Thames Challenge Cup. Many of these victories were recorded in the 19th century. The most recent Henley victory for DUBC was in 1977. On the domestic scene, DUBC are surpassed by Neptune RC and others in terms of championship wins, however, with 25 victories in the IARU Senior Eight's Championships, the club holds more wins than any other. DUBC also has 28 victories in the Wylie Cup, the Irish University Championship. In the annual Gannon Cup match against University College Dublin Boat Club (UCDBC), the record is DUBC 36 wins to UCD's 30. DUBC also holds an 8-3 advantage over Queen's University Belfast, in the more recently established Lagan Construction Boat Race.

, DUBC are reigning National Champions in the Men's Senior and Intermediate 8's, and holders of the Gannon Cup, Wylie Cup, Leander Trophy, and the Overseas Entrant Trophy for the London Head of the River.

Honours

Henley Royal Regatta

References

In Black and White: A History of Rowing at Trinity College Dublin by Raymond Blake (Dublin University Press, 1991)

External links
 

Rowing clubs in Ireland
Boat